Thorkel or Thorkell (Þórkæll / Þorkell) is an Old Norse masculine personal name. Among the more famous holders of the name are:

Thorkel of Namdalen, ninth-century jarl and father of Ketil Trout.
Thorkell Súrsson, tenth-century Icelander and character in the Gísla saga.
Thorkell Eyjólfsson, Icelandic goði of the late tenth and early eleventh century, husband of Guðrún Ósvífursdóttir and stepfather of Bolli Bollason.
Thorkell Arden, eleventh-century progenitor of the Arden family, one of only three Anglo-Saxon noble families to survive the Norman Conquest with their position and properties intact. Distant ancestor of the playwright William Shakespeare.
Thorkell the Tall, eleventh-century Jomsviking leader and jarl.
Thorkell Leifsson, Greenlandic goði of the eleventh century and son of explorer Leif Eriksson.
Thorkel Fóstri ("Foster-father Thorkel"), foster father of Thorfinn Sigurdsson, Jarl of Orkney c. 1020–1064.
Þorkell Sigurbjörnsson, Icelandic composer.
Thorkell (Vinland Saga), a fictional character from the manga series Vinland Saga